Der Spiegel (lit. "The Mirror") is a German weekly news magazine published in Hamburg. With a weekly circulation of 695,100 copies, it was the largest such publication in Europe in 2011. It was founded in 1947 by John Seymour Chaloner, a British army officer, and Rudolf Augstein, a former Wehrmacht radio operator who was recognized in 2000 by the International Press Institute as one of the fifty World Press Freedom Heroes. Typically, the magazine has a content to advertising ratio of 2:1.

Der Spiegel is known in German-speaking countries mostly for its investigative journalism. It has played a key role in uncovering many political scandals such as the Spiegel affair in 1962 and the Flick affair in the 1980s. According to The Economist, Der Spiegel is one of continental Europe's most influential magazines. The news website by the same name was launched in 1994 under the name Spiegel Online with an independent editorial staff. Today, the content is created by a shared editorial team and the website uses the same media brand as the printed magazine.

History

The first edition of Der Spiegel was published in Hanover on Saturday, 4 January 1947. Its release was initiated and sponsored by the British occupational administration and preceded by a magazine titled Diese Woche (German: This Week), which had first been published in November 1946. After disagreements with the British, the magazine was handed over to Rudolf Augstein as chief editor, and was renamed Der Spiegel. From the first edition in January 1947, Augstein held the position of editor-in-chief, which he retained until his death on 7 November 2002.

After 1950, the magazine was owned by Rudolf Augstein and John Jahr; Jahr's share merged with Richard Gruner's in 1965 to form the publishing company Gruner + Jahr. In 1969, Augstein bought out Gruner + Jahr for DM 42  million and became the sole owner of Der Spiegel. In 1971, Gruner + Jahr bought back a 25% share in the magazine. In 1974, Augstein restructured the company to make the employees shareholders. All employees with more than three years seniority were offered the opportunity to become an associate and participate in the management of the company, as well as in the profits.

Since 1952, Der Spiegel has been headquartered in its own building in the old town part of Hamburg.

Der Spiegel circulation rose quickly. From 15,000 copies in 1947, it grew to 65,000 in 1948 and 437,000 in 1961. It was nearly 500,000 copies in 1962. By the 1970s, it had reached a plateau at about 900,000 copies. When the German reunification in 1990 made it available to a new readership in former East Germany, the circulation exceeded one million.

The magazine's influence is based on two pillars; firstly the moral authority established by investigative journalism since the early years and proven alive by several impressive scoops during the 1980s; secondly the economic power of the prolific Spiegel publishing house. Since 1988, it has produced the TV program Spiegel TV, and further diversified during the 1990s.

During the second quarter of 1992 the circulation of Der Spiegel was 1.1 million copies. In 1994, Spiegel Online was launched. It had separate and independent editorial staff from Der Spiegel. In 1999, the circulation of Der Spiegel was 1,061,000 copies.

Der Spiegel had an average circulation of 1,076,000 copies in 2003. In 2007 the magazine started a new regional supplement in Switzerland. A 50-page study of Switzerland, it was the first regional supplement of the magazine.

In 2010 Der Spiegel was employing the equivalent of 80 full-time fact checkers, which the Columbia Journalism Review called "most likely the world's largest fact checking operation". The same year it was the third best-selling general interest magazine in Europe with a circulation of 1,016,373 copies.

In 2018, Der Spiegel became involved in a journalistic scandal after it discovered and made public that one of its leading reporters, Claas Relotius, had "falsified his articles on a grand scale".

Reception
When Stefan Aust took over in 1994, the magazine's readers realized that his personality was different from his predecessor. In 2005, a documentary by Stephan Lamby quoted him as follows: "We stand at a very big cannon!" Politicians of all stripes who had to deal with the magazine's attention often voiced their disaffection for it. The outspoken conservative Franz Josef Strauß contended that Der Spiegel was "the Gestapo of our time". He referred to journalists in general as "rats". The Social Democrat Willy Brandt called it "Scheißblatt" (i.e., a "shit paper") during his term in office as Chancellor.

Der Spiegel often produces feature-length articles on problems affecting Germany (like demographic trends, the federal system's gridlock or the issues of its education system) and describes optional strategies and their risks in depth. The magazine plays the role of opinion leader in the German press.

Investigative journalism
Der Spiegel has a distinctive reputation for revealing political misconduct and scandals. Online Encyclopædia Britannica emphasizes this quality of the magazine as follows: "The magazine is renowned for its aggressive, vigorous, and well-written exposés of government malpractice and scandals." It merited recognition for this as early as 1950 when the federal parliament launched an inquiry into Spiegels accusations that bribed members of parliament had promoted Bonn over Frankfurt as the seat of West Germany's government.

During the Spiegel scandal in 1962, which followed the release of a report about the possible low state of readiness of the German armed forces, minister of defense and conservative figurehead Franz Josef Strauß had Der Spiegel investigated. In the course of this investigation, the editorial offices were raided by police while Rudolf Augstein and other Der Spiegel editors were arrested on charges of treason. Despite a lack of sufficient authority, Strauß even went after the article's author, Conrad Ahlers, who was consequently arrested in Spain where he was on holiday. When the legal case collapsed, the scandal led to a major shake-up in chancellor Konrad Adenauer's cabinet, and Strauß had to stand down. The affair was generally received as an attack on the freedom of the press. Since then, Der Spiegel has repeatedly played a significant role in revealing political grievances and misdeeds, including the Flick Affair.

The Spiegel scandal is now remembered for altering the political culture of post-war Germany and—with the first mass demonstrations and public protests—being a turning point from the old Obrigkeitsstaat (authoritarian state) to a modern democracy.

In 2010, the magazine supported WikiLeaks in publishing leaked materials from the United States State Department, along with The Guardian, The New York Times, El País, and Le Monde and in October 2013 with the help of former NSA contractor Edward Snowden unveiled the systematic wiretapping of Chancellor of Germany Angela Merkel's private cell phone over a period of over 10 years at the hands of the National Security Agency's Special Collection Service (SCS).

The leading role of the magazine in investigative journalism and its monopoly came to end in 2013 since other German media outlets, including Süddeutsche Zeitung, Bild, ARD and ZDF, began to effectively deal with political scandals.

Criticism

One of the main criticism of Der Spiegel concerns its use of language. In 1957, writer Hans Magnus Enzensberger published his essay Die Sprache des Spiegels ("The Language of Der Spiegel"), in which he criticized what he called a "pretended objectivity". Wolf Schneider, an eminent journalist and stylist has called Der Spiegel "the biggest mangler of the German language" and used quotations from the magazine as examples of inept German in his style guides. Their criticism was not so much one of linguistic aesthetics as an argument that Der Spiegel "hides and distorts its actual topics and issues by manipulative semantics and rhetoric rather than by reporting and analyzing them". In 1957, however, Enzensberger admitted in a written statement that no other contemporary German magazine attained the Spiegels level of objectivity.

Opinions about the level of language employed by Der Spiegel changed in the late 1990s. After hiring many of Germany's best feature writers, Der Spiegel has become known for its "Edelfedern" ("noble quills"—wordsmiths). The magazine frequently wins the Egon Erwin Kisch Prize for the best German feature. Der Spiegel ended up joining the ranks of the guardians of proper grammar and jargon with the Zwiebelfisch ("(printer's) pie") column on the magazine's website, which has even produced several best-selling books.

Some critics, in particular the media historian Lutz Hachmeister and the Augstein biographer and former Der Spiegel author Otto Köhler, have brought charges against the magazine's dealings with former Nazis, even SS officers. Allegedly, Der Spiegel, which at other times showed no restraint when exposing the Nazi-era pasts of public figures, distorted history and covered up for criminals after enlisting insiders hired to write about Nazi-related topics. Its early reports and serials about the Reichstag fire, written by former SS officers Paul Carell (who had also served as chief press spokesman for Nazi Germany's Foreign Minister Joachim von Ribbentrop) and Fritz Tobias, have since been considered influential in historiography because since the 1960s the Spiegel reports written by these two authors have been corroborated by authoritative historian Hans Mommsen.

2018 fabrication scandal
On 19 December 2018, Der Spiegel made public that reporter Claas Relotius had admitted that he had "falsified his articles on a grand scale", inventing facts, persons and quotations in at least 14 of his stories. The magazine uncovered the fraud after a co-author of one of Relotius's stories, Juan Moreno, became suspicious of the veracity of Relotius's contributions and gathered evidence against him. Relotius resigned, telling the magazine that he was "sick" and needed to get help. Der Spiegel left his articles accessible, but with a notice referring to the magazine's ongoing investigation into the fabrications.

The Wall Street Journal cited a former Der Spiegel journalist who said "some of the articles at issue appeared to confirm certain German stereotypes about Trump voters, asking "was this possible because of ideological bias?" An apology ensued from Der Spiegel for looking for a cliché of a Trump-voting town, and not finding it. Mathias Bröckers, former Die Tageszeitung editor, wrote: "the imaginative author simply delivered what his superiors demanded and fit into their spin". American journalist James Kirchick claimed in The Atlantic that "Der Spiegel has long peddled crude and sensational anti-Americanism."

2022 fake news about refugee death at the Greece–Turkey borders
In the summer of 2022, Der Spiegel published three articles and a podcast regarding the death of a refugee girl on an islet in the Evros river at the Greece–Turkey borders, accusing Greece of failing to aid the refugees which caused the girl's death. The report led to a broad debate in the Greek public and accusations were spread against the Greek authorities. But at the end of December 2022, the  magazine retracted the articles and the podcast because they were based on fake news.
Greek government made a public comment urging Greece’s opposition party, SYRIZA, to apologise for not retracting their comments and publicly apologizing for aligning with Der Spiegel’s allegations regarding the incorrect reports.
In 2023, the Swiss newspaper, Neue Zürcher Zeitung (NZZ), wrote that this story was "one of the largest fake news breakdowns since Claas Relotius."

Bans
In January 1978 the office of Der Spiegel in East Berlin was closed by the East German government following the publication of critical articles against the conditions in the country. A special 25 March 2008 edition of the magazine on Islam was banned in Egypt in April 2008 for publishing material deemed by authorities to be insulting Islam and Muhammed.

Head office
Der Spiegel began moving into its current head office in HafenCity in September 2011. The facility was designed by Henning Larsen Architects of Denmark.

Editors-in-chief
 1962–1968: Claus Jacobi
 1968–1973: Günter Gaus
 1973–1986: Erich Böhme and Johannes K. Engel
 1986–1989: Erich Böhme and Werner Funk
 1989–1994: Hans Werner Kilz and Wolfgang Kaden
 1994–2008: Stefan Aust
 2008–2011: Mathias Müller von Blumencron and Georg Mascolo
 2011–2013: Georg Mascolo
 2013–2014: Wolfgang Büchner
 13 January 2015 – 15 October 2018: Klaus Brinkbäumer
 1 January 2019: Steffen Klusmann and Barbara Hans
 16 April 2019: Clemens Höges

See also

 List of magazines in Germany
 List of non-English newspapers with English language subsections
 Media of Germany
 Spiegel affair

References

External links
 Der Spiegel, printed edition
 Der Spiegel cover gallery and archive since 1947
 Spiegel TV Magazin 

 
1947 establishments in Germany
German-language magazines
News magazines published in Germany
Weekly magazines published in Germany
Magazines established in 1947
Magazines published in Hamburg
Mass media in Hanover
Centre-left newspapers
Liberal media in Germany
Online magazines
Censored works
Weekly news magazines
Investigative journalism